Alypia is a genus of moths in the family Noctuidae.

The genus is native to North America. Moths of this genus are generally dark to black in color with yellowish or white spots. These moths feed on plants in the grape family.

Species
Species include:
 Alypia langtoni Couper, 1865 – Langton's forester, fireweed caterpillar
 Alypia mariposa Grote & Robinson, 1868
 Alypia octomaculata (Fabricius, 1775) – eight-spotted forester
 Alypia ridingsii Grote, 1864
 Alypia wittfeldii H. Edwards, 1883

References

External links
 Alypia at Markku Savela's Lepidoptera and some other life forms
 Natural History Museum Lepidoptera genus database

Agaristinae
Noctuoidea genera